Giorgos Sielis (Greek: Γιώργος Σιέλης; born October 23, 1986) is a retired Cypriot football player. He is the brother of the international defender of Jeju United Valentinos Sielis.

References

External links
Profile on eurorivals.net
 

1986 births
Living people
Cypriot footballers
Association football midfielders
Cypriot First Division players
Cypriot Second Division players
Northallerton Town F.C. players
Charlton Athletic F.C. players
Redditch United F.C. players
Chaidari F.C. players
Apollon Limassol FC players
Olympiakos Nicosia players
AEP Paphos FC players
Anorthosis Famagusta F.C. players
AEK Kouklia F.C. players
Pafos FC players
Akritas Chlorakas players
Richmond SC players
Greek Cypriot people
Cypriot expatriate footballers
Expatriate footballers in England
Expatriate footballers in Greece
Expatriate soccer players in Australia